Gramoz Ruçi (born 6 December 1951) is an Albanian politician, serving as the head of the parliamentarian group of the ruling Socialist Party of Albania until 2017. In September 2017, he assumed the office of the Chairman of the Parliament of Albania for the new parliamentary session.

Early life
Ruçi was born in Salari, a village in Tepelenë District, southern Albania. He graduated in Chemistry and worked as a teacher in Progonat. There, he met his future wife, who was from the Goxharaj family. They married in 1976. From 1985, Ruçi entered politics.

Political career
He was named as the Labour Party's First Secretary of Tepelena District in 1988, and in 1990 he was named Minister of the Interior; however, he kept that position for only two and a half months. He was also the minister responsible of the infamous Directorate of State Security (Albanian: Drejtoria e Sigurimit të Shtetit), commonly called the Sigurimi. Its goal was protecting Albania from dangers, but de facto the Sigurimi served to suppress political activity in the population and hold the existing political system in place.From 1992 to 1996 he was Secretary General of the Socialist Party, the successor party of the Labour Party. Beginning in 1997 he was a member of parliament for the Socialist Party. In 2000, he was chosen as leader of the parliamentary group, remaining in that post until 2005. Since 2009, he has again served as head of the parliamentary group.

Personal life
Ruçi's daughter Ridvana is a senior official at the Albanian ombudsman. She completed her studies in law at the Public University of Athens. His son Ledian, born in 1985, completed his bachelor's degree for International Studies in Athens.

Gramoz speaks Albanian, Greek and Italian. He has two granddaughters and a grandson, Mia, Hera, and Roi, from his daughter.

References 

1951 births
Living people
People from Tepelenë
Labour Party of Albania politicians
Socialist Party of Albania politicians
Members of the Parliament of Albania
Government ministers of Albania
Interior ministers of Albania
21st-century Albanian politicians
Speakers of the Parliament of Albania